Ten10 or TEN10 may refer to:

 Ten10 cricket, a cricket format
 TEN (TV station), Sydney, Australia, operated by Network 10
 Ten10 (album), a 2018 album by British rapper Chip

See also
 October 10
 1010 (disambiguation)
 10x10 (disambiguation)
 10 (disambiguation)